Jurij Tepeš (born 14 February 1989) is a Slovenian former ski jumper.

Career 
Tepeš won a bronze medal at the FIS Nordic World Ski Championships 2011 in Oslo in the team large hill event. In the 2010–11 season he got his first podium in World Cup team event with Slovenia. For the first time in his career he won individual in a Grand Prix competition in Almaty, Kazakhstan.

At the FIS Ski Flying World Championships 2012 in Vikersund, he won the bronze medal with Slovenia. He won individual in a Grand Prix competition in Almaty for the second time in his career.

The 2012–13 was the most successful World Cup season in his career. His first individual podium came in Harrachov in February 2013, where he finished third. He won his first individual World Cup event in Planica in March 2013.

On 22 March 2015 in Planica, Tepeš became one of the few ski jumpers to achieve a "perfect jump", with all five judges giving him top style marks of 20.

World Cup

Standings

Wins

Personal life 
His father, Miran Tepeš, was also a ski jumper. He was also a technical delegate at the FIS Ski Jumping World Cup events. His sister Anja used to compete in the Ladies' World Cup before her retirement in 2015.

References

External links 

1989 births
Living people
Skiers from Ljubljana
Slovenian male ski jumpers
FIS Nordic World Ski Championships medalists in ski jumping
Ski jumpers at the 2014 Winter Olympics
Olympic ski jumpers of Slovenia
21st-century Slovenian people